Márton Fucsovics and Hsieh Cheng-peng were the defending champions, but Hsieh did not enter the junior competition this year.
Fucsovics played alongside Máté Zsiga, but they lost to Guilherme Clézar and Tiago Fernandes in the second round.
Duilio Beretta and Roberto Quiroz won their second Grand Slam Boys' Doubles title in the year after winning at the French Open. They defeated Oliver Golding and Jiří Veselý 6–1, 7–5 in the final.

Seeds

Draw

Finals

Top half

Bottom half

External links
Main draw

Boys' Doubles
US Open, 2010 Boys' Doubles